Toby David Godfrey Ord (born July 1979) is an Australian philosopher. He founded Giving What We Can in 2009, an international society whose members pledge to donate at least 10% of their income to effective charities, and is a key figure in the effective altruism movement, which promotes using reason and evidence to help the lives of others as much as possible. He is a senior research fellow at the University of Oxford's Future of Humanity Institute, where his work is focused on existential risk. His book on the subject The Precipice: Existential Risk and the Future of Humanity was published in March 2020.

Early life and education 
Ord was born in Melbourne, Australia, in 1979. He later attended the University of Melbourne, where he initially studied computer science. On completing his first degree, he switched to studying philosophy to pursue his interest in ethics, later stating: "At this stage I knew that I wanted to make a large positive difference in the world and it seemed that studying ethics would help."

For his graduate studies, Ord moved to the University of Oxford, where he obtained a B.Phil., and a D.Phil. in philosophy. Having submitted his doctoral thesis, Beyond Action: Applying Consequentialism to Decision Making and Motivation, Ord was retained as a junior research fellow by Balliol College, Oxford.

Career 
Since 2014, Ord has been at Oxford's Future of Humanity Institute, where he holds the position of a senior research fellow. Ord describes his focus as "the big picture questions facing humanity." He is a trustee of the Centre for Effective Altruism and of the non-profit organization 80,000 Hours, researching careers that have the largest positive social impact and providing career advice based on that research.

Research

Ethics 
Ord's work has been primarily in moral philosophy. In applied ethics, he has worked on bioethics, the demands of morality, and global priority setting. He has also made contributions in global health, as an advisor to the third edition of Disease Control Priorities Project. In normative ethics, his research has focused on consequentialism, and on moral uncertainty.

Existential risk 

Ord's current main research interest is existential risk. His book on the topic The Precipice: Existential Risk and the Future of Humanity was published in March 2020. The New Yorker characterizes Ord's research motivation as follows:A concern for existential risk seemed, to Ord, to be the next logical expansion of a broadening moral circle. If we can learn to value the lives of people in other places and circumstances equally to our own, then we can do the same for people situated at a different moment in time. Those future people, whose quality of life and very existence will be intimately affected by our choices today, matter as much as we do

Hypercomputation 
Ord has written papers on the viability and potentials for hypercomputation, models of computation that can provide outputs that are not Turing-computable such as a machine that could solve the halting problem.

Giving What We Can 
At Oxford, Ord resolved to give a significant proportion of his income to the most cost-effective charities he could find. Following a number of enquiries from people interested in making a similar commitment, Ord decided to set up an organisation geared towards supporting like-minded donors.

In 2009, Ord launched Giving What We Can, an international society whose members have each pledged to donate at least 10% of their income to the most cost-effective charities. The organisation is aligned with, and part, of the effective altruism movement. Giving What We Can seeks not only to encourage people to give more of their money to charity but also stresses the importance of giving to the most cost-effective ones, arguing that "research shows that some are up to 1,000 times as effective as others." By February 2020 Giving What We Can had grown to over 4,500 members, who have pledged over $1.5 billion to charities.

Ord himself decided initially to cap his income at £20,000 per year, and to give away everything he earned above that to well-researched charities. A year later, he revised this figure down to £18,000. This threshold rises annually with inflation. As of December 2019, he had donated £106,000, or 28 percent of his income. Over the course of his career, he expects his donations to total around £1 million.

Personal life 
Ord lives in Oxford with his wife, Bernadette Young, a medical doctor. She is also a member of Giving What We Can.

Bibliography

Books
 2020 – The Precipice: Existential Risk and the Future of Humanity, Toby Ord, 
 2020 – Moral Uncertainty, William MacAskill, Krister Byvist, & Toby Ord,

Journal articles (selected)
 2019 – 
 2018 – 
 2015 – 
 2014 – 
 2014 – 
 2013 – 
 2010 – 
 2006 –

See also

Reversal test
Nick Bostrom
William MacAskill

References

External links 
 
 The Precipice

1979 births
Living people
21st-century Australian philosophers
Academics of the University of Oxford
Alumni of Balliol College, Oxford
Alumni of Christ Church, Oxford
Analytic philosophers
Consequentialists
People associated with effective altruism
People from Melbourne
Utilitarians
University of Melbourne alumni